Cathy McLeod (born 12 June 1957) is a former Canadian politician who served as the Member of Parliament (MP) for the riding of Kamloops—Thompson—Cariboo from 2008 to 2021. She served as a member of the Conservative Party.

Biography
McLeod was born in Kingston, Ontario, Canada.

In 1981, McLeod completed training from the University of Western Ontario as a registered nurse, practicing for some years thereafter.

McLeod was a municipal politician in Pemberton, British Columbia, serving as a town councillor from 1993 to 1996 and then as mayor from 1996 to 1999, before moving to Kamloops, where she worked as a nurse and a health care administrator.

In the 2008 federal election, McLeod was elected Member of Parliament for the riding of Kamloops—Thompson—Cariboo. She was re-elected in the 2011 federal election with 52% of the riding's vote. On 30 January 2011, she became Parliamentary Secretary to the Minister of National Revenue. On 19 September 2013, she became Parliamentary Secretary to the Minister of Labour and for Western Economic Diversification. From 20`

McLeod was re-elected in the 2015 and 2019 federal elections. On 4 February 2021, McLeod announced she would not seek re-election.

Electoral record

References

External links
Cathy McLeod

1957 births
Women members of the House of Commons of Canada
Conservative Party of Canada MPs
Living people
Mayors of places in British Columbia
Members of the House of Commons of Canada from British Columbia
People from Kamloops
People from Kingston, Ontario
University of Western Ontario alumni
Women mayors of places in British Columbia
21st-century Canadian politicians
21st-century Canadian women politicians
Canadian nurses
Canadian women nurses